Hurst and Blackett was a publisher founded in 1852 by Henry Blackett (26 May 1825 – 7 March 1871), the grandson of a London shipbuilder, and Daniel William Stow Hurst (17 February 1802 – 6 July 1870). Shortly after the formation of their partnership Hurst and Blackett took over the business of the long established publisher Henry Colburn, for whom Daniel Hurst had worked for some years, and their earliest publications displayed "Successors to Henry Colburn" on the title pages. This was subsequently replaced by the epithet "Publishers since 1812", probably in reference to the date when Henry Colburn had commenced publishing.

Four of Henry Blackett's sons became publishers. Hurst and Blackett were located on Great Marlborough Street, where Henry Colburn had maintained his premises, and later at Paternoster House, Paternoster Row, London and had offices in New York and Melbourne. They were taken over by Hutchinson, which later became part of Random House.

Book series
 Arcadian Novels
 Hurst & Blackett's Colonial Library
 Hurst and Blackett's Copyright Novels
 Hurst and Blackett's 6d. Copyright Novels
 Hurst and Blackett's 1/- net Novels
 Hurst & Blackett's 7d. Novels 
 Hurst & Blackett's Famous Copyright Novels
 Hurst & Blackett's Famous 6d. Novels
 Hurst and Blackett's Standard Library
 Kiddi-logues Series
 Paternoster Library 
 Toucan Novels
 The Valentine Romance Club series

References

External links 
 Hurst and Blackett on Wayback Machine
 Blacketts and Literature on theblacketts.com

Book publishing companies of the United Kingdom
Publishing companies established in 1852
1852 establishments in England